Shaun Anderson (born October 29, 1994) is an American professional baseball pitcher for the Kia Tigers of the Korea Baseball Organization (KBO). He has played in Major League Baseball (MLB) for the San Francisco Giants, Minnesota Twins, Baltimore Orioles,  San Diego Padres and Toronto Blue Jays. He played college baseball for the University of Florida. The Boston Red Sox selected Anderson in the third round of the 2016 MLB draft.

Amateur career
Anderson attended American Heritage High School in Plantation, Florida. His junior year he was 6-1 with an 0.77 ERA, and his senior year he was 12-1 with a 1.10 ERA. In the 2013 Major League Baseball draft, the Washington Nationals selected Anderson in the 40th round, with the 1,216th overall pick, the final pick in the draft.

Anderson enrolled at the University of Florida to play college baseball for the Florida Gators. He began his collegiate career as a starting pitcher, but transitioned into a relief pitcher. He started one game for the Gators, while spending the rest of his time with the Gators in relief. He played collegiate summer baseball as a starting pitcher for the Lakeshore Chinooks of the Northwoods League in 2014 and the Wareham Gatemen of the Cape Cod Baseball League in 2015. In 2016, as a junior he pitched to a 3–0 win–loss record and a 0.97 earned run average (ERA) with 13 saves (leading the SEC) in 36 games and 60 strikeouts in 46.1 innings for the Gators, which tied the Gators single-season record for saves. He was named First Team All-American by the NCBWA, Second Team All-American by Collegiate Baseball, the American Baseball Coaches Association (ABCA)/Rawlings, and Perfect Game/Rawlings, Third Team All-American by D1baseball.com, and named to the ABCA All-South Region First Team and to the All-SEC First Team.

Professional career

Boston Red Sox
The Boston Red Sox selected Anderson in the third round of the 2016 MLB draft, intending to use him as a starting pitcher, and he signed for a signing bonus of $700,000. The Red Sox assigned him to the Lowell Spinners of the Class A-Short Season New York-Penn League. Anderson pitched only  innings in 2016, giving up nine runs. He began the 2017 season with the Greenville Drive of the Class A South Atlantic League. The Red Sox promoted Anderson to the Salem Red Sox of the Class A-Advanced Carolina League in May.

San Francisco Giants
On July 25, 2017, the Red Sox traded Anderson and Gregory Santos to the San Francisco Giants in exchange for Eduardo Núñez. The Giants assigned him to the San Jose Giants of the Class A-Advanced California League, where he finished the season. In 24 total games between Greenville, Salem-Keizer, and San Jose, with 23 of those being starts, Anderson posted a 9–6 record with a 3.44 ERA. Anderson began the 2018 season with the Richmond Flying Squirrels of the Class AA Eastern League. He was selected to represent the Giants at the 2018 All-Star Futures Game. In July, the Giants promoted him to the Sacramento River Cats of the Class AAA Pacific Coast League.

Anderson began the 2019 season with Sacramento, with whom he was 2-1 with a 3.76 ERA in 8 starts covering 38.1 innings in which he struck out 41 batters. The Giants promoted Anderson to make his major league debut on May 15 against the Toronto Blue Jays. His two hits in the game made him the first Giants pitcher since at least 1908 to have a multi-hit game with the bat in his first major league game. With the Giants in 2019 he was 3-5 with two saves and a 5.44 ERA in 28 games (16 starts) in which he pitched 96 innings.

In 2020, Anderson was used exclusively out of the bullpen, appearing in 18 games. He had 18 strikeouts in  innings.

Minnesota Twins
On February 4, 2021, the Giants traded Anderson to the Minnesota Twins in exchange for LaMonte Wade. In  innings over four appearances for Minnesota in 2021, Anderson pitched to a 9.35 ERA with eight strikeouts.

Texas Rangers
On June 18, 2021, Anderson was claimed on waivers by the Texas Rangers. He was then assigned to the Triple-A Round Rock Express, where he recorded 3.0 scoreless innings for the team. On June 29, Anderson was designated for assignment without having appeared in a game for the team.

Baltimore Orioles
On July 3, 2021, Anderson was claimed on waivers by the Baltimore Orioles and optioned to the Triple-A Norfolk Tides. On August 4, Anderson was designated for assignment by the Orioles.

San Diego Padres
On August 7, 2021, Anderson was claimed off of waivers by the San Diego Padres. He was assigned to the Triple-A El Paso Chihuahuas.

Toronto Blue Jays
On November 19, 2021 Anderson was claimed off waivers by the Toronto Blue Jays. On November 30, Anderson was outrighted off of the 40-man roster. He was designated for assignment on July 6, 2022.

Kia Tigers 
On November 26, 2022, Anderson signed with the Kia Tigers of the KBO.

References

External links

Living people
1994 births
Sportspeople from Coral Springs, Florida
Baseball players from California
Major League Baseball pitchers
San Francisco Giants players
Minnesota Twins players
Baltimore Orioles players
San Diego Padres players
Toronto Blue Jays players
Florida Gators baseball players
Wareham Gatemen players
Lowell Spinners players
Greenville Drive players
Salem Red Sox players
San Jose Giants players
Richmond Flying Squirrels players
Sacramento River Cats players
St. Paul Saints players
Round Rock Express players
El Paso Chihuahuas players
American Heritage School (Florida) alumni
Buffalo Bisons (minor league) players
Lakeshore Chinooks players